Audriņi Parish is an administrative unit of Rēzekne Municipality, Latvia.

Towns, villages and settlements of Audriņi parish 
 Audriņi

References 

Parishes of Latvia
Rēzekne Municipality